Bozhidar Boykov Kraev (born 23 June 1997) is a Bulgarian professional footballer who plays as an attacking midfielder and second striker for A-League Men club Wellington Phoenix and the Bulgarian national team.

Career

Early career
Born in Vratsa, at the age of six Kraev began playing football at the local club Botev Vratsa, for whom his father Boyko Kraev had also played. In 2008, he joined Hristo Stoichkov's academy in Vilafranca, Spain, as a part of a Gillette programme for young talented players, which was initiated by Stoichkov. Two years later, Kraev returned to his home country to join Chavdar Etropole. Then he spent one year with his first club Botev Vratsa. He has a brother Andrian, who currently plays for Levski Sofia.

Levski Sofia
In January 2013, at the age of 15, Kraev joined Levski Sofia's academy. He made his first team debut in a 1–1 league draw against Lokomotiv Plovdiv on 19 July 2014, coming on as a second-half substitute. On 23 September, he marked his first start by scoring a hat-trick in a 7–1 away win over Spartak Varna in the Bulgarian Cup. On 14 October, Kraev was named by The Guardian as one of the forty most promising young players in the world.

On 12 December 2014, Kraev signed his first professional contract, on a three-year deal. Two days later, he was invited for a trial at Juventus. In January 2015, Kraev also spent a week on trial at English club Manchester City.

Kraev scored his first league goal for Levski in an 8–0 home win over Haskovo on 27 February 2015. On 26 May 2015, he scored his first A Group hattrick in a 6–0 win against Marek Dupnitsa. Kraev's hattrick was the 100th in Levski's history in the Bulgarian league.

On 9 April 2017, Kraev scored four goals in a 5–0 win over Lokomotiv Plovdiv, thereby becoming the youngest player in Levski history to score four goals in one game.

Midtjylland
On 19 June 2017, Kraev signed with Danish Superliga side Midtjylland on a five-year deal for a reported fee of €500,000. He made his debut for the team in a Europa League match against Derry City coming on as a substitute in the 73rd minute and scoring a goal 10 minutes later. On 12 April 2018, Kraev scored twice in a 2-1 win against Hobro IK and qualified his team for the cup's semifinals after coming on as a substitute in the 77th minute and scoring both goals in the game's added time. Three days later, he scored his first league goal in a 2-1 win against FC Nordsjælland.

Kraev was part of the squad that won the Danish Cup and the Danish Superliga for Midtjylland during his stay at the Herning club.

On 22 June 2019, Kraev was sent on a season-long deal at the Portuguese Primeira Liga team Gil Vicente. Kraev made his debut for the team in a Taça da Liga match against Aves, providing an assist for the first goal and later scored the winning goal in the 90th minute for a 3–2 win. A week later, on 10 August, Kraev made his league debut, playing a full match against Porto, providing the winning goal in the 77th minute, for a 2–1 win over one of the league favorites.

On 11 January 2021, Kraev was sent on a loan with option to buy to Portuguese Primeira Liga team Famalicão, until the end of the season.

Wellington Phoenix
On July 22, 2022, the Wellington Phoenix confirmed they had signed Kraev on a two-year deal. Kraev made his Phoenix debut on 3 August, scoring in a 4–0 win over Devonport City Strikers in the Australia Cup.

International career
In March 2016, Kraev was in the starting lineup of Bulgaria U19 for the 0-1 defeats from Belgium U19 and Croatia U19. On 13 May 2016 he was included in the Bulgaria U21 squad for the 2016 Toulon Tournament.

On 22 May 2022 Midtjylland confirmed, that Kraev was one out of seven players, which contracts had came to an end, and therefore would leave the club.

In November 2016, Kraev received his first call-up to the senior Bulgaria squad for a 2018 FIFA World Cup qualifying match against Belarus. He remained on the bench for the game. On 25 March 2017, Kraev made his complete debut for the team coming on as a substitute during the 2–0 home win over Netherlands for the 2018 FIFA World Cup qualification.
On 6 September 2018, he scored 2 goals against Slovenia in the UEFA Nations' League, helping his country to 3 points.

Career statistics

Club Statistics
As of 27 February 2022

International goals

Score and result list Bulgaria's goal tally first.

Personal life
Bozhidar is the son of Boyko Kraev, a former professional footballer who played for Botev Vratsa, and brother of Andrian Kraev, footballer for Levski Sofia.

Honours
FC Midtjylland
Danish Superliga: 2017–18
Danish Cup: 2018–19

Individual
Best progressing young player in Bulgarian football: 2014, 2015

References

External links
 
 Profile at LevskiSofia.info

1997 births
Living people
Bulgarian footballers
Bulgarian expatriate footballers
Bulgaria youth international footballers
Bulgaria under-21 international footballers
Bulgaria international footballers
Association football midfielders
First Professional Football League (Bulgaria) players
Danish Superliga players
Primeira Liga players
PFC Levski Sofia players
FC Midtjylland players
Gil Vicente F.C. players
F.C. Famalicão players
Wellington Phoenix FC players
Expatriate men's footballers in Denmark
Expatriate footballers in Portugal
Expatriate soccer players in Australia
Bulgarian expatriate sportspeople in Denmark
Bulgarian expatriate sportspeople in Portugal
Bulgarian expatriate sportspeople in Australia
People from Vratsa